The term pollen source is often used in the context of beekeeping and refers to flowering plants as a source of pollen for bees or other insects. Bees collect pollen as a protein source to raise their brood. For the plant, the pollinizer, this can be an important mechanism for sexual reproduction, as the pollinator distributes its pollen. Few flowering plants self-pollinate; some can provide their own pollen (self fertile), but require a pollinator to move the pollen; others are dependent on cross pollination from a genetically different source of viable pollen, through the activity of pollinators.  One of the possible pollinators to assist in cross-pollination are honeybees. The article below is mainly about the pollen source from a beekeeping perspective.

The pollen source in a given area depends on the type of vegetation present and the length of their bloom period.  What type of vegetation will grow in an area depends on soil texture, soil pH, soil drainage, daily maximum and minimum temperatures, precipitation, extreme minimum winter temperature, and growing degree days.  The plants listed below are plants that would grow in USDA Hardiness zone 5.  A good predictor for when a plant will bloom and produce pollen is a calculation of the growing degree days.

The color of pollen below indicates the color as it appears when the pollen arrives at the beehive.  After arriving to the colony with a fresh load of pollen, the honey bee unloads its pollen from the pollen basket located on its hind legs. The worker bees in the colony mix dry pollen with nectar and/or honey 
with their enzymes, and naturally occurring yeast from the air.  Workers then compact the pollen. storing each variety in an individual wax hexagonal cell (honeycomb), typically located within their bee brood nest. This creates a fermented pollen mix call beekeepers call 'bee bread'.  
Dry pollen, is a food source for bees, which may contain 16–30% protein, 1–10% fat, 1–7% starch, many vitamins, some micro nutrients, and possibly a little sugar.  The protein source needed for rearing one worker bee from larval to adult stage requires approximately 120 to 145 mg of pollen.  An average bee colony will collect about 20 to 57 kg (44 to 125 pounds) of pollen a year.

Spring

Trees and shrubs – Spring

Gallery

Flowers and annual crop plants – Spring

Summer

Trees and shrubs – Summer

Flowers and annual crop plants – Summer

Fall

Trees and shrubs – Fall

Flowers and annual crop plants – Fall

See also
Forage (honey bee)
List of honey plants
Melliferous flower
Nectar source

References

+
+
Agriculture-related lists
Beekeeping
Crops
Gardening lists
Lists of plants
Sustainable agriculture
Sustainable gardening
Trees